Bai Yan and Li Zhe were the defending champions but chose not to defend their title.

Andreas Mies and Oscar Otte won the title after defeating Kimmer Coppejans and Márton Fucsovics 4–6, 7–6(14–12), [10–8] in the final.

Seeds

Draw

References
 Main Draw

Garden Open - Doubles
2017 Doubles
Garden